Louise Rial ( – August 10, 1940) was an American stage and film actress.

Rials's parents were Thomas C. Grover and Caroline Grover (nee Chamberlin). She had four siblings Burr, Leonard, Lucien and Julia Grover. Her theatrical debut came in Uncle Tom's Cabin (1878). She continued acting on stage before entering silent films in 1915 with the early Fox Film Corporation.

On August 10, 1940, Rial died in her New York City home, aged 91. She is buried in an actor's plot at Kensico Cemetery Valhalla New York. Her daughter Vira Rial is buried with her in the plot.

Filmography
Sin (1915)
The Marble Heart (1916)
A Wife's Sacrifice (1916)
The Spider and the Fly (1916)
A Daughter of the Gods (1916)
Tangled Lives (1917)
My Little Sister (1919)

References

External links
 
Louise Rial at IBDb.com
portrait(archived)
 Louise and Jay Rial 1881 poster for "Uncle Tom's Cabin" (Wayback Machine)
 Louise Rial  with Robert B. Mantell and Genevieve Hamper in Fox's "A Wife's Sacrifice" 1916 page 107

1850s births
1940 deaths
American stage actresses
American silent film actresses
20th-century American actresses